The Ministry of Justice of Ethiopia has the authority of federal prosecution and had possessed executive and judicial powers. The ministry was a part of the federal branch of the government, and prosecuted cases that fell within the federal jurisdiction. In 1995, the responsibility for the federal police force and prisons was transferred to the Ministry of Justice after the Ministry of Internal Affairs was abolished. In 2017, it was announced that the Ministry of Justice's affairs would be transitioned into the Federal Attorney General's Office.

Creation and legal basis 
According to Article 16 of Proclamation 691/2010, the Ministry of Justice had the following powers:

 Is chief advisor to the Federal Government on matters of law; Represents the Federal Government in criminal cases falling under the jurisdiction of the Federal Courts; withdraw criminal charges for good causes; follow up the execution of decisions of the courts
 Orders the conduct of investigation where it believes that a crime the adjudication of which falls under the jurisdiction of the federal courts has been committed; orders the discontinuance of an investigation or instructs further investigation on good cause; withdraw criminal charges in accordance with the law;
 Undertakes legal reform studies; carry out codification and consolidation of federal laws, collect Regional State laws and consolidate as necessary
 Assist in the preparation of draft laws when so requested by federal organs and regional states;
 Undertake or order the conduct of investigation where it believes that a crime the adjudication of which falls under the jurisdiction of the federal courts has been committed; direct and supervise the process of the investigation; allow plea bargain; upon the existence of good cause, decide on the discontinuance of an investigation or the carrying out of additional investigation;
 Studies the causes of and the methods of crime prevention; devise ways and means of crime prevention; coordinate the relevant government organs in crime prevention;
 Ensure that witnesses to a criminal case are accorded protection, as necessary;
 Assists victims of crimes or violations of human rights in civil proceedings to claim damages where such victims are unable to institute such claims in federal courts and to follow up the proceeding on their own;
 Institutes or cause the institution of suits or intervene at any stage of the proceedings of such suits before federal and regional state courts, any judicial body or arbitration tribunal where the rights and interests of the public and of the Federal Government so require;
 Registers religious organizations, nonprofit making foreign organizations and, unless specific power is given to other government organs, non-governmental organizations and associations operating in the cities of Addis Ababa and Dire Dawa or in more than one Regional State;
 Follows up, as necessary, the handling of civil suits and claims to which the federal government organs are parties; cause reports-to be submitted to it on same, and ensure that competent staff is assigned for the purpose;
 Issues, supervises and revokes licenses advocates for practicing before federal courts;
 Provides legal education through the use of various methods with a view to raising public legal consciousness in relation to the protection of human rights; cooperate with the appropriate bodies regarding legal education and training;

History 
In 2016, Getachew Ambaye was successively the Minister of Justice and then Attorney General under the administrative renaming of the position.

List of ministers (post-occupation in 1942)

See also 
 Justice ministry
 Politics of Ethiopia

References 

Justice ministries
Government of Ethiopia
Government ministries of Ethiopia